Harrisburg, California may refer to:
 Harrisburg, former name of Warm Springs, Fremont, California
 Harrisburg, Inyo County, California